The Penn State Nittany Lions basketball team is an NCAA Division I college basketball team representing the Pennsylvania State University. They play home games at the 15,261-seat Bryce Jordan Center, moving there from Rec Hall during the 1995–96 season. Their student cheering section is known as the Legion of Blue.

The program has ten NCAA tournament appearances with its best finish coming in 1954, reaching the Final Four.  Its most recent appearance was in 2023, when the team beat [Texas A&M] in the first round.  The program also has 11 appearances in the National Invitation Tournament, with the most recent being in 2018, when they beat Utah to win the NIT championship. They also won the NIT championship in 2009.

Current coaching staff

Coaching history

Postseason

NCAA tournament results
The Nittany Lions have appeared in the NCAA tournament 10 times. Their combined record is 10–11.

NIT results
The Nittany Lions have appeared in the National Invitation Tournament (NIT) 11 times. Their combined record is 27–9. They were NIT champions in 2009 and 2018.

CBI results
The Nittany Lions have appeared in the College Basketball Invitational (CBI) once. Their record is 1–1.

Statistical Leaders

1,000 Point Scorers 

+ 2020 B1G Tournament and 2020 NCAA Tournament cancelled due to COVID-19 Pandemic.

** denotes active player.

Assists

Rebounds (650+)

All-Americans

NBA players

NBA Draft

Other players 
The following is a list of undrafted Penn State players who have played at least one NBA regular or post-season game. Bold denotes players with active NBA or NBA G League contracts.

 Lamar Stevens
 Josh Reaves
 Tim Frazier
 Chris Babb
 John Amaechi
 Joe Crispin
 Tom Hovasse
 Herschel Baltimore
 John Barr

International players

Chris Babb (born 1990), basketball player in the Israeli Basketball Premier League
Tony Carr (born 1997), basketball player in the Israeli Premier Basketball League
Trey Lewis (born 1992), basketball player in the Israeli Basketball Premier League
Mike Watkins (born 1995), basketball player for Hapoel Haifa in the Israeli Basketball Premier League

Season by Season Records

Overcoming historical irrelevance
At a school where the football program captures the vast majority of media and fan interest, the basketball program has historically struggled to draw fans and administrative support. Penn State is consistently ranked near the bottom of the Big Ten in attendance and revenue, which has been attributed to local apathy and noncompetitive teams. The Bryce Jordan Center has far more seats than can regularly be filled, and large, black curtains cover parts of the upper deck during most non-conference and weekday games.

Penn State has come close to breaking through on several occasions in the 21st century, only to fall back to mediocrity. They reached the Sweet Sixteen for the first time in over 50 years in 2001 after upsetting #2 North Carolina in the Round of 32, only to fall to a 3–13 record in the Big Ten the next year. The 2008-09 and 2017-18 teams won the NIT, but did not reach the tournament the next year.

Penn State hoops reached new levels of popularity during the 2019–20 season after fielding a team that peaked at #9 in the Associated Press (AP) poll. The team hosted its first sellout since 2011 in a February showdown against Minnesota, a contest they would win 83–77, extending a mid-season win streak that would eventually reach eight games. 

Students rallied around the idea of Penn State as a "basketball school," and players such as seniors Lamar Stevens and Mike Watkins became household names across campus, even among non-basketball fans. In what was referred to as "the most Penn State basketball thing ever" by fans on social media, the season was cancelled prior to the start of the Big Ten Tournament due to the COVID-19 outbreak. Stevens finished only seven points from becoming Penn State's all-time leading scorer, a feat that would almost certainly have been reached had the season not been cut short. Though an NCAA tournament bracket was never officially revealed, head coach Pat Chambers announced that the 2019-20 team would be included on the team banner of tournament appearances.

Penn State Men's Basketball Radio Affiliates

 WAEB (790 AM) Allentown
 WTNA (1430 AM) Altoona
 WILK-FM (103.1 FM) Avoca
 WNNA (106.1 FM) Beaver Springs
 WRAX (1600 AM) Bedford
 WISR (680 AM) Butler
 WCPA (900 AM) Clearfield
 WQQP (95.9 FM) DuBois
 WPSE (1450 AM) Erie
 WFRA (1450 AM) Franklin
 WGET (1320 AM) Gettysburg
 WHVR (1280 AM) Hanover
 WHGB (1400 AM) Harrisburg
 W237DE (95.3 FM) Harrisburg
 WODS (1300 AM) Hazleton

 WRKK (1200 AM) Hughesville
 WDBF-FM (106.3 FM) Huntingdon
 WRKY (1490 AM) Lancaster
 WNPV (1440 AM) Lansdale
 WLBR (1270 AM) Lebanon
 WIBF (92.5 FM) Lewistown
 WOGA (92.3 FM) Mansfield
 WMGW (1490 AM) Meadville
 WUZZ (1280 AM) New Castle
 WVNJ (1160 AM) New York City, NY
 WNTP (990 AM) Philadelphia
 KQV (1410 AM) Pittsburgh
 WPPA (1360 AM) Pottsville
 WRAW (1340 AM) Reading
 WAAF (910 AM) Scranton

 WLEJ (1450 AM) State College
 WKOK (1070 AM) Sunbury
 WTIV (1230 AM) Titusville
 WTZN (1310 AM) Troy
 WTRN (1340 AM) Tyrone
 W264BZ (100.7 FM) Tyrone
 WICU (1310 AM) Warren
 WNBT-FM (104.5 FM) Wellsboro
 WILK (980 AM) Wilkes-Barre
 WRAK (1400 AM) Williamsport
 WSBA (910 AM) York

References

External links